The "Watch Valley" covers all the Swiss Jura Arc, from Geneva to Basel, and is the primary location of the Swiss watch-making industry. 

Beginning initially in 15th century Geneva, the cradle of the European time keeping industry, and spreading north east through the Jura Mountains, the great majority of the companies related to the Swiss watch-making industry were first established. Continuing to the present day, centuries of tradition, rigor, and the know-how of skilled artisans, has forged the world recognized reputation of the great Swiss watch houses.

Some of the famous watchmakers currently producing in the Watch Valley include OMEGA, Breitling, Corum, Gallet, Girard-Perregaux,  Patek Philippe, Rolex, TAG Heuer, Blancpain, Ulysse Nardin, Chopard, Baume & Mercier, and others.

Some of the earliest watchmakers to manufacture timepieces in the Watch Valley were Vacheron Constantin (Est. 1755), Breguet (Est. 1775), Blancpain (*Est. 1735), Jaquet Droz (Est. 1738 in La Chaux-de-Fonds). Abraham-Louis Breguet played a great role in the advancement in Watch technology. In 1790 Breguet invented arguably the most important invention for watches to date. It was a shock-absorber known as the “para-chute” which helped prevent delicate parts in a Watch from breaking when dropped. This greatly improved the accuracy and dependability of watches at that time and paved the road to what we see in current timepieces.
 
Honorable Mention: Favre-Leuba (Est. 1737 in Le Locle) was a mid-higher end range maker of Swiss watches. They used many different movements from A.Schild SA as well as calibers produced In-House. They worked with Girard-Perregaux, Zodiac, Ebel, and others to create a 36,000 VPH movement based on the A.Schild Caliber 1687. While the name is still being used on watches today they are not the same company as it succumbed to the Quartz crisis and were forced to sell the company in the 1980’s. 

While some argue Blancpain is the oldest watchmaker, they did have a brief period where production was stopped, while Vacheron did not. 

UNESCO World Heritage Sites 

Both Le Locle and its geographical twin town La Chaux-de-Fonds have now been recognised as an UNESCO World Heritage Site, for their horological and related cultural past.

See also
Federation of the Swiss Watch Industry FH
Vaud
canton Berne
canton of Jura
Basel-Country
Canton of Neuchâtel

Notes

External links
UNESCO World Heritage List: La Chaux-de-Fonds / Le Locle, Watchmaking Town Planning
Federation of the Swiss Watch Industry FH
"Jura and Three Lakes", Switzerland Tourism
Watch Valley, juradreiseenland.ch

Economy of Switzerland
Horology
Swiss Jura